Þórunn Egilsdóttir (23 November 1964 – 9 July 2021) was an Icelandic politician who was a member of the Althing (Iceland's parliament) for the Northeast Constituency from 2013 until her death, and she also served as chairman of the parliamentary group of the Progressive Party since 2016. 

Þórunn died from breast cancer at a hospital in Akureyri on 9 July 2021, aged 56.

References

External links 
Biography of Þórunn Egilsdóttir on the parliament website (Icelandic)

2021 deaths
1964 births
Thorunn Egilsdottir
Thorunn Egilsdottir
Deaths from breast cancer
Thorunn Egilsdottir
Thorunn Egilsdottir
Thorunn Egilsdottir
Thorunn Egilsdottir
Thorunn Egilsdottir